Vasilios Voutsinas (born 5 September 1980) is a Greek footballer, who currently plays for Ethnikos Piraeus in the Football League 2 as a goalkeeper. Nicknamed Superman, he is known as a very smart Goalkeeper with great reflexes and communication with his teammates. He helped his team to win Piraeus amateur league Group 2 and EPSP Cup unbeaten.

References
 Vasilis Voutsinas

1980 births
Living people
Greek footballers
Ethnikos Piraeus F.C. players
Atromitos F.C. players
Aias Salamina F.C. players
Association football goalkeepers
Footballers from Piraeus